Spiraeanthus is a monotypic genus of shrub in the rose family containing the single species Spiraeanthus schrenkianus. It is native to Kazakhstan and possibly Kyrgyzstan. It is a resident of low parts of Karatau Mountains and gravely Betpak-Dala deserts.

This is a shrub covered in fernlike foliage made up of fronds of small leaflets. At the ends of the erect branches of this spreading bush are inflorescences of rose spiraealike flowers. It is a relict of the Eocene and the closest relative of Chamaebatiaria.

This species is included on the Regional Red List of Kazakhstan. It is under protection in the Karatau Nature Reserve.

References

External links
Red Book of Kazakhstan
Divercity of Flora of Kazakhstan
Photo at mobot.org

Sorbarieae
Monotypic Rosaceae genera
Flora of Kazakhstan